The following is a list of county roads in Indian River County, Florida.  All county roads are maintained by the county in which they reside.

County roads in Indian River County

References

FDOT Map of Indian River County
FDOT GIS data, accessed January 2014

 
County